Luna 26 (Luna-Resurs-Orbiter  or Luna-Resurs O ) is a planned lunar polar orbiter, part of the Luna-Glob program, by Roscosmos. In addition to its scientific role, the Luna 26 orbiter would also function as a telecomm relay between Earth and Russian landed assets. This mission was announced in November 2014, and its launch is planned for 2027 on a Soyuz-2.1b launch vehicle.

Overview 
The Luna 26 orbiter mission has been in planning since at least 2011. Originally it was envisioned to be launched to the Moon together with the lunar lander Luna 27 which will land on the South Pole–Aitken basin, an unexplored area on the far side of the Moon, but because of mass limitations, they will be launched separately. The orbiter's mass is about 2100 kg.

The objective of the orbiter is to locate and quantify natural lunar resources that can be exploited by future landed missions. After completion of its primary mission, the spacecraft's orbit will be raised to about 500 km altitude to study cosmic rays.

International collaboration 
The European Space Agency (ESA) had intended to contribute to this and other Luna-Glob missions in the manner of communications, precision landing, hazard avoidance, drilling, sampling, sample analysis and ground support. ESA cooperation with Russia on Luna 26 was discontinued on 13 April 2022 as a consequence of the Russian invasion of Ukraine.

As of October 2017, the U.S. space agency NASA was negotiating and assessing a potential collaboration with the Luna-Glob missions Luna 25 through Luna 28.

In September 2019, the China National Space Administration (CNSA) and Roscosmos signed two agreements on scientific cooperation and coordination between Luna 26 and the upcoming Chang'e 7 lunar polar orbiter.

Scientific payload 
The scientific payload on board the orbiter is composed of fourteen instruments  that will be fabricated by Russia and by some European partners. The payload will study the lunar surface and the environment around the Moon, including the solar wind, and high-energy cosmic rays. The orbiter may carry some NASA instruments, or instruments from private U.S. companies. Luna 26 will also scout sites for the planned Luna 27 landing mission.

See also 

 Exploration of the Moon

References 

Missions to the Moon
Russian space probes
Russian lunar exploration program
2024 in Russia
2024 in spaceflight
Proposed space probes